Blastobasis sciota is a moth in the family Blastobasidae.

References

Arctiidae genus list at Butterflies and Moths of the World of the Natural History Museum

Blastobasis
Moths described in 1961